Van Vechten is a surname. Notable individuals with this surname include:

 Abraham Van Vechten (1762–1837), American lawyer and Federalist politician;  New York State Attorney
 Carl Van Vechten (1880–1964), American writer and photographer
 Helen Van Vechten (1868–1949), American printer of fine press books
 Lee Rex Van Vechten (1935–2003), American marketing pioneer with several best selling publications

See also
 Alice Van Vechten Brown
 J. Van Vechten Olcott
 Jacob Van Vechten Platto
 John Van Vechten House
 Van Vechten Veeder

 Surnames of Dutch origin